Catamount Records is a Nashville, Tennessee-based record label founded in 1999 by Eric Babcock, the former co-founder of Bloodshot Records and Checkered Past Records.

Notable artists
Johnny Dowd
Souled American
Dave Schramm

References

Record labels established in 1999
Record labels based in Nashville, Tennessee
1999 establishments in Tennessee